Nicole Catala (2 February 1936 – 19 October 2022) was a French academic and politician.

Biography
Catala was born in Millau on 2 February 1936 and was the sister of law professor . An associate professor of private law, she taught in Dakar from 1962 to 1964 before returning to France and teaching in Dijon in 1969.

Political career
Catala began her political involvement with the Rally for the Republic (RPR). She was a member of the Economic and Social Council from 1979 to 1984. In 1981, she founded the think tank  alongside Michel Aurillac and Alain Juppé. On 20 March 1986, she was nominated by Prime Minister Jacques Chirac to become Secretary of State for Vocational Training.

In 1988, Catala was elected to the National Assembly to represent Paris's 11th constituency. She was re-elected in 1993 and became Vice-President of the National Assembly alongside Philippe Séguin. She was re-elected once again in 1997 and served as Vice-President of the National Assembly for two more stints.

While serving in the National Assembly, Catala was a member of the Council of Paris, first elected in 1989 and re-elected in 1995 and 2001 on the list of the 14th arrondissement. In 1998, she was elected President of the RPR in Paris.

In 2002, the RPR was dissolved and succeeded by the Union for a Popular Movement (UMP), which chose  as their candidate in that year's legislative election. Catala ran as an independent, but ultimately lost her seat in the National Assembly.

In 2014, she joined the presidential primary committee of The Republicans for the 2016 primary.

Personal life and death
On 7 July 1965, Catala married Raymond Franjou, the Socialist Party Mayor of Forcalquier, whom she divorced in 1972 after having a daughter, Marianne, in 1970 with him.

Catala died on 19 October 2022 in Paris at the age of 86.

Decorations
Officer of the National Order of Merit (2012)

References

1936 births
2022 deaths
Rally for the Republic politicians
Councillors of Paris
Members of Parliament for Paris
Deputies of the 9th National Assembly of the French Fifth Republic
Deputies of the 10th National Assembly of the French Fifth Republic
Deputies of the 11th National Assembly of the French Fifth Republic
Academic staff of Paris 2 Panthéon-Assas University
Officers of the Ordre national du Mérite
Secretaries of State of France